Kalevi is a Finnish and Estonian masculine given name and surname. Notable people with the name include:

Given name
 Kalevi Aho (born 1949), Finnish composer
 Kalevi Eskelinen (born 1945), Finnish cyclist
 Kalevi Häkkinen (1928–2017), Finnish alpine skier
 Kalevi Hämäläinen (1932–2005), Finnish cross-country skier
 Kalevi Holsti (born 1935), Canadian political scientist
 Kalevi Huotari (1924–1975), Finnish politician
 Kalevi Huuskonen (1932–1999), Finnish biathlete
 Kalevi Kärkinen (1934–2004), Finnish ski jumper
 Kalevi Kiviniemi (born 1958), Finnish organist
 Kalevi Kivistö (born 1941), Finnish politician
 Kalevi Kostiainen (born 1967), Finnish sailor 
 Kalevi Kosunen (born 1947), Finnish boxer
 Kalevi Kotkas (1913–1983), Estonian-born Finnish athlete
 Kalevi Kull (born 1952), Estonian scientist
 Kalevi Laitinen (gymnast) (1918–1997), Finnish gymnast
 Kalevi Laitinen (speed skater) (1919–1995), Finnish speed skater
 Kalevi Lehtovirta (1928–2016), Finnish footballer
 Kalevi Laurila (1937–1991), Finnish cross-country skier
 Kalevi Marjamaa (born 1953), Finnish boxer
 Kalevi Mononen (1920–1996), Finnish cross-country skier
 Kalevi Numminen (born 1940), Finnish ice hockey player
 Kalevi Oikarainen (1936–2020), Finnish cross-country skier
 Kalevi Pakarinen (1939–1999), Finnish fencer
 Kalevi Rassa (1936–1963), Finnish ice hockey player
 Kalevi Remes (1925–1984), Finnish politician
 Kalevi Sorsa (1930–2004), Finnish politician
 Kalevi Tuominen (1927–2020), Finnish multi-sport athlete and coach
 Kalevi Vähäkylä (born 1940), Finnish biathlete 
 Kalevi Viskari (1928–2018), Finnish gymnast
 Kalevi Wiik (1932–2015), Finnish linguist

Surname
Jaakko Eino Kalevi (born 1984), Finnish musician

References

Finnish masculine given names
Estonian masculine given names